The Cyprus Aircraft Accident Incident Investigation Board (AAIIB) is an agency of the government of Cyprus, headquartered in Nicosia.

It is a part of the Ministry of Communications and Works and was established on 1 October 2003.

References

External links
 Air Accident and Incident Investigation Board

Organizations established in 2003
2003 establishments in Cyprus
Cyprus
Government of Cyprus
Aviation organisations based in Cyprus